The 1975–76 Scottish Cup was the 91st staging of Scotland's most prestigious football knockout competition. The Cup was won by Rangers who defeated Heart of Midlothian in the final.

First round

Replays

Second Replays

Second round

Replays

Third round

Replays

Fourth round

Replays

Quarter-finals

Replays

Second Replays

Semi-finals

Replays

Final

See also

1975–76 in Scottish football
1975–76 Scottish League Cup

Scottish Cup seasons
1975–76 in Scottish football
Scot